Buttermere is a civil parish in the Borough of Allerdale in Cumbria, England.  It contains eleven listed buildings that are recorded in the National Heritage List for England.  All the listed buildings are designated at Grade II, the lowest of the three grades, which is applied to "buildings of national importance and special interest".  The parish is in the Lake District National Park and contains lakes and fells with the valleys between them.  In the valleys are the village of Buttermere, and the settlement of Brackenthwaite; all the listed buildings are in the valleys, most of them in or near the settlements.  They consist of farmhouses and farm buildings, houses, and a church.


Buildings

References

Citations

Sources

Lists of listed buildings in Cumbria